Bernard Herzbrun (January 10, 1891 – January 7, 1964) was an American art director. He was nominated an Academy Award in the category Best Art Direction for the film Alexander's Ragtime Band. He worked on 275 films between 1930 and 1955. He was born in New York City, New York and died in Los Angeles, California.

Selected filmography
 Alexander's Ragtime Band (1938)
 The Black Castle (1952)

References

External links

1891 births
1964 deaths
American art directors
Artists from New York City